Eagle Lake, is an elongated lake in shape located in the northern portion of Eagle Lake, Florida. This lake is a natural freshwater lake with a  surface area.  Eagle Lake is bordered by residences of Eagle Lake and Polk County.

The City of Eagle Lake maintains a boat ramp, and recreation area on the Eastern shore of Eagle Lake. Eagle Avenue leads directly into the public parking and access areas. There is a swimming area available with a white sand beach, and a pavilion is available as well. Eagle Lake contains predominantly largemouth bass, as well as bluegill and crappie.

References

Lakes of Polk County, Florida